Aksay dungeons are dungeons of the town Aksay in Rostov oblast.

History 

The first recordings about the existence of the dungeons belong to the period of Peter the Great.

There were casemates located nearby the fortress in Ust-Aksay camp in the 18th century. There were taken Turkish soldiers. Their labour was used for building the tunnels.

On the map with the first layout of the settlement, where the town is located now, the marks of the Turkish fortresses are visible. By the 1850s Aksai had about 30 underground structures of different purposes. According to the engineer Alexander Rigelman, who also built the fortress of Dmitry Rostovski in this area was an underground structure, which was located under the building. There were many entrances to the dungeons. In the 1970s new object was discovered — the door in the underground passage in the area of fleet "Donplodoprom". The door is old, coated with iron, two-leafed folding. The stoned poles were used to strengthen it. Behind the door there was a passage, but at the time of detection of the door, it was ruined. In this place there was a gunpowder factory, the warehouses of which eventually exploded, and the place received the name of the Powder beam.

There was a well near the house No. 15 on Pugachev street earlier in Aksay. Limestone was used for its construction. There was a passage which led to the secret room. The well dates back to the 18th century. The water in the well was filled with 4–5 meters, the width of the well was small. Here was also discovered stage. Behind the wall of the well was a small room with wooden beds and empty bottles.

The list of objects that belong to the dungeons of the city of Aksay is quite large. It is an exposition of the military-historical Museum complex, which can be visited by tourists, the dungeons of the Customs Outpost Dating from the 18th century, the underground headquarters of the Squaw and the catacombs of the Kobyakov settlement, to which tourists have no access. Also these dungeons include tunnels Mukhina beams and caves. Because of a series of tragic cases, there is reason to believe that the dungeons are still kept ancient traps

References 

Tourist attractions in Rostov Oblast
Museums in Rostov Oblast